Pherecydes of Leros was, according to the Suda, an ancient Greek historian from the island of Leros, who lived "before the seventy-fifth Olympiad" (480–477 BC), and wrote three works: On Leros (Περὶ Λέρου), On Iphigenia  (Περὶ Ἰφιγενείας), and On the Festivals of Dionysus (Περὶ τῶν Διονύσου ἑορτῶν). Although, the Suda considers them separately, he is possibly the same person as Pherecydes of Athens.

Notes

References
 Fowler, Robert L., "The Authors named Pherecydes", Mnemosyne, Fourth Series, Vol. 52, Fasc. 1 (Feb., 1999), pp. 1-15. .
 Mac Sweeney, Naoise, Community Identity and Archaeology: Dynamic Communities at Aphrodisias and Beycesultan, University of Michigan Press, 2011. .

People from Leros
Early Greek historians
5th-century BC historians
Year of birth unknown
Year of death unknown